Mackeson Stout is a beer.

Mackeson may also refer to:

Rupert Mackeson, 2nd Baronet (born 1941), British author and former soldier
Mackeson baronets, a title in the Baronetage of the United Kingdom

See also
 Mackensen (disambiguation)